The Suwannee Limestone is an Early Oligocene geologic formation of exposed limestones in North Florida, United States.

Description 
Suwannee Limestone is found in the peninsula carbonate outcroppings on the northwestern, northeastern and southwestern flanks of the Ocala Platform. However, Suwannee Limestone is not present on an area known as Orange Island on the eastern side of the Ocala Platform due to erosion, nondeposition or both. This limestone is present in southeastern Leon, Jefferson, Madison, Taylor, Lafayette counties as well as Hamilton along the upper Suwannee River basin, and southward into Suwannee County, Florida.

Early Oligocene Suwannee Limestone was recognized in the northwestern peninsula by P. F. Huddleston in 1993 as a triple subdivision of Suwannee Limestone, Ellaville Limestone, and Suwannacoochee Dolostone. The Suwannacoochee Dolostone was later officially renamed as the Suwannacoochee Dolomite.

Sedimentology 
Suwannee Limestone consists of a white to cream, poorly to well hardened, fossil rich, vuggy to moldic grainstone and packstone. The dolomitized parts of the Suwannee Limestone are gray, tan, light brown to moderate brown, moderately to well indurated (hard), finely to coarsely crystalline, dolomite with limited occurrences of fossil-bearing beds. Limestone in silicate form is common in Suwannee Limestone.

Stratigraphy 
The Suwannee Limestone overlies the Ocala Limestone and forms part of the intermediate confining unit/aquifer system. (USGS)

Fossil content 
 Foraminifers
 Echinoids
 Bryozoans
 Mollusks

References 

Geologic formations of Florida
Geologic formations of Georgia (U.S. state)
Oligocene Series of North America
Rupelian Stage
Paleogene Florida
Paleogene Georgia (U.S. state)
Paleogene stratigraphic units of North America
Limestone formations of the United States